Christian Cavallo is an Australian professional football (soccer) player who plays as a defender for  Dandenong Thunder. He made his debut for the Melbourne City senior team on 28 October 2016, coming on in the 90th minute in a 2–1 win. He was released by Melbourne City on 3 May 2018.

References

External links

Living people
1996 births
Australian soccer players
Association football defenders
Melbourne Victory FC players
Melbourne City FC players
National Premier Leagues players
A-League Men players